Puerto Rico Highway 511 (PR-511) is a tertiary state highway in Ponce, Puerto Rico.

Route description
The road runs south to north, connecting PR-14 at its southern terminus to PR-143 at its northern terminus. It runs mostly along the Inabón River in the road's southern portions through barrio Real and along the Anón River in its northern portion, once the road enters barrio Anón.

Improvements
Puerto Rico Legislature Joint Resolution 795 of 5 July 2010, which sought to order the Oficina de Gerencia y Presupuesto the assignment of $4.2 million to the Puerto Rico Highways and Transportation Authority (Autoridad de Carreteras y Transportación) to make improvements to the road, was not approved.

On 30 March 2011, Puerto Rico Senator Larry Seilhamer Rodríguez, presented Senate Joint Resolution 774 to order the Puerto Rico Highway and Transportation Authority to rebuild PR-511 at km. 11.5 (in the Real Anón sector) where the road had been severely damaged in 2005 due to heavy rains.

In October 2013, the residents of barrio Anon collected money to make the improvements themselves but their efforts were halted after learning they could be the subjects of lawsuits.

History
In 1930, 2.1 kilometers of this road were built by Lorenzo J. Davila, the contractor for the job, at a cost of $18,755.

Major intersections

See also

 List of highways in Ponce, Puerto Rico
 List of highways numbered 511

References

External links
 
 Guía de Carreteras Principales, Expresos y Autopistas 

511
Roads in Ponce, Puerto Rico